Al-Funoon was an Arabic-language magazine founded in New York City by Nasib Arida in 1913 and co-edited by Mikhail Naimy, "so that he might display his knowledge of international literature." As worded by Suheil Bushrui, it was "the first attempt at an exclusively literary and artistic magazine by the Arab immigrant community in New York." 

According to historian Hani J. Bawardi, "Al-Funūn is still considered one of the most influential magazines in Arab literary history despite its constant financial troubles during its short life. The magazine's nationalism accounted for much of its influence."

Khalil Gibran had contributed to the magazine.

References

Bibliography

External links
 Collection (Moise A. Khayrallah Center for Lebanese Diaspora Studies)
 Devoted website (Nasib Aridah Organization)

1913 establishments in the United States
1918 disestablishments in the United States
Arabic-language magazines
Defunct literary magazines published in the United States
Magazines established in 1913
Magazines disestablished in 1918
Magazines published in New York City